Gogo ornatus is a species of catfish of the family Anchariidae endemic to Madagascar where it is found in the Mangoro River basin.  It reaches a length of 21.2 cm.

References 
 

Anchariidae
Taxa named by Heok Hee Ng
Taxa named by John Stephen Sparks 
Fish described in 2005